The 2017–18 SLC Twenty20 Tournament was a Twenty20 cricket tournament that was held in Sri Lanka. It was played between domestic teams in Sri Lanka, with the tournament starting on 24 February 2018 and concluding on 8 March 2018. The matches were used as preparation for the 2018 Nidahas Trophy.

Following the conclusion of the group stage, Colombo Cricket Club, Tamil Union Cricket and Athletic Club, Sri Lanka Army Sports Club and Nondescripts Cricket Club progressed to the quarterfinals. Nondescripts Cricket Club won the tournament, after they beat Colombo Cricket Club by six runs in the final.

In February 2019, Sri Lanka Cricket named Ruvindu Gunasekara as the tournament's Best Batsman, Lasith Malinga as the Best Bowler and Chaturanga de Silva as the Player of the Tournament.

Fixtures

Group stage

Group A

Group B

Group C

Group D

Knockout stage

Quarterfinals

Finals

References

External links
 Series home at ESPN Cricinfo

SLC Twenty20 Tournament
SLC Twenty20 Tournament